The 1936 United States presidential election in Nevada took place on November 3, 1936, as part of the 1936 United States presidential election. State voters chose three representatives, or electors, to the Electoral College, who voted for president and vice president.

Nevada was won by incumbent President Franklin D. Roosevelt (D–New York), running with Vice President John Nance Garner, with 72.81% of the popular vote, against Governor Alf Landon (R–Kansas), running with Frank Knox, with 27.19% of the popular vote.

, this is the last occasion Douglas County voted for a Democratic presidential candidate, and the last time a Democratic nominee won every single county in the state.

Results

Results by county

See also
United States presidential elections in Nevada

References

Nevada
1936